Speake (formerly, Hodges Store) is an unincorporated community in Lawrence County, Alabama, United States.

Notable people
 Lucas Black, actor; grew up and graduated high school in Speake.
 Jesse Owens, Olympic gold medalist; born in Speake/Oakville.

References

Unincorporated communities in Lawrence County, Alabama
Unincorporated communities in Alabama